Brill Bruisers is the sixth studio album by Canadian indie rock band the New Pornographers. It was released on August 26, 2014 and debuted at number 13 on the Billboard 200. In describing the album, A.C. Newman called it "a celebration record... After periods of difficulty, I am at a place where nothing in my life is dragging me down and the music reflects that."

The first single from the album was "Brill Bruisers", released on June 10, 2014. The second single, "War on the East Coast", was released on July 16, 2014. The album was a longlisted nominee for the 2015 Polaris Music Prize on June 16, 2015, and was shortlisted on July 16, 2015.

Track listing

The song "Spidyr" is a remake of Daniel Bejar's song "Spider" from Swan Lake's album Enemy Mine.

Amber Webber of Black Mountain and Lightning Dust shares vocals with Bejar on "Born with a Sound".

Vinyl edition

A special "paint spattered" limited-edition vinyl LP of the album was made available via pre-order. The LP includes a 3D-poster and 3D-glasses.

Personnel
Dan Bejar
Kathryn Calder
Neko Case
John Collins
Kurt Dahle
Todd Fancey
A.C. Newman
Blaine Thurier
Howard Redekopp - Engineer

References

External links

2014 albums
Matador Records albums
The New Pornographers albums
Last Gang Records albums
Albums produced by John Collins (Canadian musician)
Albums produced by A. C. Newman